Ten Wood is a  biological Site of Special Scientific Interest east of Burrough Green in Cambridgeshire.

This ancient wood is of the ash/maple type, which has a high conservation value as it has a restricted and declining distribution. Other trees include hazel and pedunculate oak. There is also a population of the rare oxlip.

The site is private land with no public access.

References

Sites of Special Scientific Interest in Cambridgeshire